Lürssen is a surname. Notable people with the surname include:

 Christian Luerssen (1843–1916), German botanist
 Friedrich Lürssen (1851–1916), German shipbuilder and company founder of Lürssen
 Otto Lürssen (1889–1932), German shipbuilder and businessman

German-language surnames